Major General Renuka Rowel, RWP, USP was a Sri Lankan Army senior officer. He was the 10th Colonel Commandant of the Sri Lanka Signals Corps and the Chief Signal Officer of Sri Lanka Army.

Education 
Rowel holds a bachlor's degree in electronics engineering from University of Moratuwa, Sri Lanka. In addition to that he became the first in the Order of Merit at the Army Command and Staff Course conducted at the Army Command and Staff College, Sri Lanka. Further, he is an alumnus of the United States Army Command and General Staff College and the National Defense University, Pakistan.
In addition, he has followed the Senior Command Course in India, Mid Career Course in Pakistan, Signal Officers’ Advance Course in US and the Signal Young Officers’ Course in India. Rowel received his school education from Athurugiriya Maha Vidyalaya, Vidyaloka College, Galle, Richmond College, Galle and Tissa Central, Kalutara.

Military career 
He was enlisted to the Army in October 1981 and commissioned to the Sri Lanka Signal Corps as a Second Lieutenant having completed his Bachelor of Science Engineering Degree in Electronics at the Sir John Kotelawala Defence Academy and University of Moratuwa. Rowel who counts over 33 years of distinguished service in Sri Lanka Army and well recognized for his outstanding performances in military ;Command, Staff and Instructional appointments and in the field of Information and Telecommunication engineering. He is one of the driving figures for the present infrastructure development of the Sri Lanka Army Trunk Communication Network, initiation of Cyber Security Framework and introducing the Sri Lanka Army Data Network (SLADN).

References 

 COLONEL COMMANDANT OF THE REGIMENT - Sri Lanka Signal Corps
 http://www.army.lk/details.php?type=article&id=240
 http://www.vivalanka.com/newspage/320233ai-dfcc-vardhana-bank-kilinochchi
 http://www.jesaonline.org/index.php?option=com_content&view=article&id=591%3Aa-new-pre-school-for-the-war-affected-children-in-sri-lanka&catid=46%3Ajesa&Itemid=202
 http://www.news.lk/news/sri-lanka/item/8217-farewell-to-outgoing-chief-of-defence-staff
 http://np.gov.lk/index.php?option=com_content&view=article&id=1804:kilinochchi-shops-handed-over-to-the-owners-24-june-2012&Itemid=101
 http://www.nation.lk/epaper/sunday/2014/11/09/files/assets/basic-html/page22.html
 HighBeam

Sri Lankan Buddhists
Sri Lankan major generals
Sinhalese military personnel
Alumni of Richmond College, Galle
Living people
Sri Lanka Signals Corps officers
Alumni of Vidyaloka College
Year of birth missing (living people)